Alexander Yordanov (Bulgarian: Александър Александров Йорданов, Aleksand'r Aleksandrov Jordanov, born 13 February 1952) is a Bulgarian literary critic and politician who was elected as a Member of the European Parliament in 2019.

References

MEPs for Bulgaria 2019–2024
GERB MEPs
Living people
1952 births